= Ranunculus simulans =

Scientific classification
- Kingdom: Plantae
- Clade: Tracheophytes
- Clade: Angiosperms
- Clade: Eudicots
- Order: Ranunculales
- Family: Ranunculaceae
- Genus: Ranunculus
- Species: R. simulans

Binomial name
- Ranunculus simulans Garn.-Jones

Synonyms
- Ranunculus depressus var. stewartiae G.Simpson & J.S.Thomson

Species of flowering plant

Ranunculus simulans is a species of flowering plant in the buttercup family, Ranunculaceae. It is endemic to New Zealand.
